The year 1993 is the first year in the history of Pancrase, a mixed martial arts promotion based in the Japan. In 1993 Pancrase held 4 events beginning with, Pancrase: Yes, We Are Hybrid Wrestlers 1.

Events list

Pancrase: Yes, We Are Hybrid Wrestlers 1

Pancrase: Yes, We Are Hybrid Wrestlers 1 was an event held on September 21, 1993, at Tokyo Bay NK Hall in Nagoya, Urayasu, Chiba, Japan.

Results

Pancrase: Yes, We Are Hybrid Wrestlers 2

Pancrase: Yes, We Are Hybrid Wrestlers 2 was an event held on October 14, 1993, at The Tsuyuhashi Sports Center in Nagoya, Aichi, Japan.

Results

Pancrase: Yes, We Are Hybrid Wrestlers 3

Pancrase: Yes, We Are Hybrid Wrestlers 3 was an event held on November 8, 1993, at Kobe World Commemoration Hall in Kobe, Hyogo, Japan.

Results

Pancrase: Yes, We Are Hybrid Wrestlers 4

Pancrase: Yes, We Are Hybrid Wrestlers 4 was an event held on December 8, 1993, at Hakata Star Lanes in Hakata-ku, Fukuoka, Japan.

Results

See also 
 Pancrase
 List of Pancrase champions
 List of Pancrase events

References

Pancrase events
1993 in mixed martial arts